Banholt (Limburgish: Tebannet) is a village in the Dutch province of Limburg. It is part of the municipality of Eijsden-Margraten and lies about 10 km southeast of Maastricht.

The village was first mentioned in 1294 or 1295 as Bannoyt. Banholt which developed in the Middle Ages on the plateau of Margraten. In the 18th century, it became a road village.

The Catholic St Gerlachus Church is a three aisled church with wide church which was constructed between 1874 and 1876. Banholt was home to 471 people in 1840.

Gallery

References

Populated places in Limburg (Netherlands)
Eijsden-Margraten